Dowling v. United States, 473 U.S. 207 (1985), was a United States Supreme Court case that discussed whether copies of copyrighted works could be regarded as stolen property for the purposes of a law which criminalized the interstate transportation of property that had been "stolen, converted or taken by fraud" and holding that they could not be so regarded under that law.

Background
Paul Edmond Dowling ran a bootleg recording business distributing Elvis Presley records through the United States Postal Service. Dowling, a zealous Presley fan, worked with William Samuel Theaker to produce records of unreleased Presley recordings such as those from concerts and television shows. The two men used the services of a record-pressing company in Burbank, Los Angeles County, California.

Dowling's trial and appeals

The federal government brought its initial case against Dowling in the United States District Court for the Central District of California, arguing his guilt on the basis that he had no legal authority to distribute the records. Dowling was convicted of one count of conspiracy to transport stolen property in interstate commerce, eight counts of interstate transportation of stolen property, nine counts of copyright infringement, and three counts of mail fraud. The charges of mail fraud arose out of his use of the United States Postal Service to distribute the records.

Dowling appealed all convictions besides those of copyright infringement and the case moved to the Ninth Circuit Court of Appeals, where he argued that the goods he was distributing were not "stolen, converted or taken by fraud", according to the language of 18 U.S.C. 2314 - the interstate transportation statute under which he was convicted. The court disagreed, affirming the original decision and upholding the conviction. Dowling then took the case to the Supreme Court, which sided with his argument and reversed the convictions. From the Reporter of Decision's syllabus:

See also
 List of United States Supreme Court cases, volume 473
 United States v. LaMacchia, 871 F.Supp. 535 (D.Mass. 1994)

References

External links
 

United States Supreme Court cases
United States Supreme Court cases of the Burger Court
United States copyright case law
1985 in United States case law
Elvis Presley
Bootleg recordings